The siege of Tabriz took place in 1501 just after the Safavids had defeated the Aq Qoyunlu in the Battle of Sarur. In the preceding battle the Aq Qoyunlus army was 4 times bigger than the Safavid army. After the siege Ismail I chose Tabriz as his capital and proclaimed himself Shahanshah of Iran.

References

1501 in Asia
Battles involving Safavid Iran
Conflicts in 1501
History of Tabriz
16th century in Iran